Kosmodemyansky is a Russian masculine surname, its feminine counterpart is Kosmodemyanskaya. It may refer to:

Aleksandr Kosmodemyansky (1925-1945), Soviet military officer
1977 Shura, an asteroid named after Aleksandr Kosmodemyansky
Lyubov Kosmodemyanskaya (1900–1978), Soviet social worker, mother of Aleksandr and Zoya
2072 Kosmodemyanskaya, an asteroid named after Lyubov Kosmodemyanskaya
Zoya Kosmodemyanskaya (1923-1941), Soviet partisan, sister of Aleksandr
1793 Zoya, an asteroid named after Zoya Kosmodemyanskaya

Russian-language surnames